The 668th Aircraft Control and Warning Squadron is an inactive United States Air Force unit. It was last assigned to the San Francisco Air Defense Sector, Air Defense Command, stationed at Mather Air Force Base, California. It was inactivated on 1 September 1961.

The unit was a General Surveillance Radar squadron providing for the air defense of the United States.

Lineage
 Established as 668th Aircraft Control and Warning Squadron
 Activated on 8 December 1949
 Discontinued and inactivated on 1 September 1961

Assignments
 542d Aircraft Control and Warning Group, 8 December 1949
 28th Air Division, 6 February 1952
 San Francisco Air Defense Sector, 1 July 1960 - 1 September 1961

Stations
 Hamilton AFB, California, 8 December 1949
 Mather AFB, California, 10 January 1951 - 1 September 1961

References 

  Cornett, Lloyd H. and Johnson, Mildred W., A Handbook of Aerospace Defense Organization  1946 - 1980,  Office of History, Aerospace Defense Center, Peterson AFB, CO (1980).
 Winkler, David F. & Webster, Julie L., Searching the Skies, The Legacy of the United States Cold War Defense Radar Program,  US Army Construction Engineering Research Laboratories, Champaign, IL (1997).

External links 

Radar squadrons of the United States Air Force
Aerospace Defense Command units